

 Albert Praun (11 December 1894, in Bad Staffelstein – 3 March 1975) was a German general who became the Chief Signals Officer of the Wehrmacht during World War II.

Biography
Praun served during World War I. He was retained in the Reichswehr and then served in the Wehrmacht; between 1935 and 1940 he commanded signals units. In 1940 he was then appointed Chief Signals Officer of Panzer Group Hoth and Panzer Group Guderian in France. He was then posted to the Eastern Front where he served as Chief Signals Officer of the 2nd Panzer Group. He later was the commanding officer of the 4th Panzer Grenadier Brigade and then of the 18th Panzer Division, and the 129th and the 277th Divisions. 

When General Erich Fellgiebel and then his deputy Fritz Thiele were arrested and subsequently executed for their roles in the 20 July plot, Praun was appointed to succeed them on 1 November 1944 as Chief Signals Officer at the Oberkommando der Wehrmacht and Oberkommando des Heeres and was promoted to General der Nachrichtentruppe.

At the end of the war in May 1945 Praun was taken into captivity by the western allies and interrogated in France about his activities when serving there.  At the end of August 1945 he was moved to prison camps at Neustadt, Hesse and Bad Hersfeld and he was released from captivity in June 1947. In 1950 France requested Praun's extradition for war crimes committed when he served there, but the request was refused by the Americans on grounds of lack of evidence. He lived in Munich until his death aged 80.

Praun was the author of a lengthy report on German SIGINT in WW2, prepared for the USA, which was only released to the public in 2014.

Awards
 Iron Cross (1914)
 2nd Class
 1st Class
 Wound Badge (1914)
 in Black
 Honour Cross of the World War 1914/1918
 Wehrmacht-Dienstauszeichnung 4th to 1st Class
 Anschluss Medal
 Sudetenland Medal with Prague Castle Bar
 Iron Cross
 2nd Class
 1st Class
 Eastern Front Medal
 German Cross in Gold (7 February 1943)
 Knight's Cross of the Iron Cross on 27 October 1943 as Generalleutnant and commander of 129. Infanterie-Division

References

Citations

1894 births
1975 deaths
People from Bad Staffelstein
Generals of Signal Troops
Recipients of the Gold German Cross
Recipients of the Knight's Cross of the Iron Cross
German Army personnel of World War I
People from the Kingdom of Bavaria
Military personnel from Bavaria
Reichswehr personnel
People of the Federal Intelligence Service
People sentenced to death in absentia
German Army generals of World War II